Alan Cooper (born 1966) is a New Zealand evolutionary molecular biologist and an ancient DNA researcher. He is considered a significant figure in the development of ancient DNA research, and was involved in many of the early discoveries in the field. He was the inaugural director of both the Henry Wellcome Ancient Biomolecules Centre at the University of Oxford from 2001–2005, and the Australian Centre for Ancient DNA at the University of Adelaide, South Australia from 2005–2019. In December 2019, the University dismissed him, citing "serious misconduct".

Early life and education
Cooper was born in Dunedin, New Zealand and grew up in Wellington, New Zealand, where he was involved in cave exploration and cave rescue at university and regional level. He was awarded a PhD from the Victoria University of Wellington in 1994 for evolutionary studies of New Zealand birds. During his PhD he also worked at the University of California, Berkeley supervised by Allan C. Wilson and Svante Pääbo.

Career
In 1999, Cooper established the Henry Wellcome Ancient Biomolecules Centre at the University of Oxford and in 2002 was made Professor of Ancient Biomolecules at Oxford. In 2004, he was awarded an Australian Research Council (ARC) Federation Fellowship. He resigned from Oxford in 2005, following an internal investigation into allegations that he fabricated data in grant applications. He subsequently moved to the University of Adelaide to establish the Australian Centre for Ancient DNA. At Adelaide, he led the Ancient DNA node of the Genographic Project examining human origins and dispersal from 2005–2010. He was awarded a series of ARC Fellowships: Federation (2005–2010), Future (2011–2014), and Laureate (2014–2019) researching human evolution and climate change. Cooper was suspended from the University of Adelaide in September 2019, following allegations that he bullied staff and students at the Australian Centre for Ancient DNA, which he denied. He was dismissed in December 2019 for what the University dubbed "serious misconduct."

Research
Cooper has published over 27 papers in the journals Nature and Science. In 2000, with Henrik Poinar, he suggested that the standards of much ancient DNA research were insufficient to rule out contamination, especially in studies of ancient humans.

In 2001, he used these methods to characterise the first complete mitochondrial genome sequences from extinct species, two New Zealand moa.

Cooper has analysed ancient DNA from extinct species preserved in caves, permafrost areas of Alaska and the Yukon, Antarctica, and sedimentary and archaeological deposits around the world. He has published on the evolutionary history of a range of enigmatic extinct species including: New Zealand moa and Madagascan elephant bird (Aepyornis), the Dodo (Raphus cucullatus), American lion (P. leo atrox) and cheetah-like cat (Miracinonyx), North and South American horses (stilt-legged horse, Hippidion), steppe bison, bears (Arctodus, U. arctos), cave hyenas (Crocuta spelaea), mammoth, and the Falkland Islands wolf (Dusicyon australis). He has also shown that the calcified plaque on the teeth of ancient skeletons can be used to reconstruct the evolution of the human microbiome through time.

In 2021, Cooper and colleagues published a paper in Science, arguing that the extinction of Neanderthals and the appearance of cave paintings could be linked to a geomagnetic excursion approximately 41,000 years ago, dubbed the Laschamp event. The claims were met with skepticism by other experts.

Awards
 Eureka Prize (2017)
 South Australian Scientist of the Year (2016)
 ARC Laureate Fellowship (2014)
 Royal Society of South Australia Verco Medal (2013)
 ARC Future Fellowship (2011)
 ARC Federation Fellowship (2004)
 Zoological Society of London Medal (2002)

He was awarded the Walter Fitch Award (1994) and the Ernst Mayr Award (1995) for his PhD research into the evolution of New Zealand birds.

References

1966 births
Living people
New Zealand biologists
Molecular biologists
Victoria University of Wellington alumni
Academics of the University of Oxford
Academic staff of the University of Adelaide